The Bishop of Motherwell is the Ordinary of the Roman Catholic Diocese of Motherwell in the Province of Glasgow, Scotland.

The see is in the town of Motherwell where the bishop's seat is located at the Cathedral Church of Our Lady of Good Aid. The Diocese of Motherwell comprises the parishes of St Benedict and St Clare, Easterhouse; Baillieston and Craigend and Garthamlock in the city of Glasgow, and the council areas of North Lanarkshire (except the parishes of Kilsyth, Condorrat, Croy and Cumbernauld and the area of Auchinloch) and South Lanarkshire.

The diocese, along with the Diocese of Paisley, was erected as a Suffragan See by the Apostolic Constitution Maxime interest on 25 May 1947. The new See took part of the Archdiocese of Glasgow (becoming its Suffragan See) and part of the Diocese of Galloway. 

On Tuesday 29 April 2014 - the Feast of St Catherine of Siena Pope Francis appointed the Right Reverend Joseph Toal, previously Bishop of Argyll and The Isles as fifth Bishop of Motherwell. Bishop Toal succeeded the Right Reverend Joseph Devine, whose resignation was accepted by Pope Francis on 30 May 2013.

List of bishops of Motherwell

See also
Roman Catholicism in Scotland

References

 
Religion in Motherwell

de:Bistum Motherwell